The Vištinės or Vishtines is a Lithuanian breed of domestic goose. It was developed by selective breeding of traditional Lithuanian geese, with some later influence from the East Prussian, Emden and Pomeranian breeds.

History 

The Vištinės was developed by selective breeding of traditional Lithuanian geese; there was some later intromission from the East Prussian, Emden and Pomeranian breeds. It was formerly widespread in Lithuania, but was largely displaced by more proactive imported breeds. In 2007 its conservation status was listed by the FAO as "critical".

The Vištinės contributed to the development of the white Kuban goose in the Kuban region of Russia.

Characteristics 

The birds are deep and broad in the body, with short legs, a curving neck and a full breast. The plumage is entirely white, the feet and shanks orange, and the beak orange-red.

Use 

The carcase yield is about 70%, of which some 13–14% is fat.

References 

Goose breeds originating in Lithuania
Goose breeds